Sandokan to the Rescue (Italian: Sandokan alla riscossa) is a 1907 adventure novel by the Italian writer Emilio Salgari. It is the seventh in his series featuring the nineteenth century Malayan pirate Sandokan. It is also known by the alternative title The Reckoning.

Adaptation
In 1964 it served as the basis for a film adaptation of the same name directed by Luigi Capuano and starring Ray Danton in the title role. A later film La tigre è ancora viva: Sandokan alla riscossa! was also inspired by the novel.

References

Bibliography
 Goble, Alan. The Complete Index to Literary Sources in Film. Walter de Gruyter, 1999.

1907 novels
Novels by Emilio Salgari
Italian adventure novels
Italian novels adapted into films
Novels set in the 19th century